Bengt Berger (born 31 August 1942 in Stockholm, Sweden) is a Swedish jazz musician (drummer), composer and producer.

Berger has studied north and south Indian music since the 1960s with Pandit Taranath Rama Rao and Mridangam Vidwan P.S. Devarajan and plays the tabla and mridangam.

Discography
 Spelar (1978)
 Bitter Funeral Beer (ECM, 1981)
 Praise Drumming (Dragon, 1987)
 Tarang (Rub-a-Dub, 1995)
 All Time High (Amigo, 1999)
 Live in Frankfurt 82 (Country & Eastern, 2007)
 Beches Brew (Country & Eastern, 2009)
 Blues for E.D (Gazell, 2012)
 The Vedbod Tapes (Country & Eastern, 2012)
 Beches Brew Big (Country & Eastern, 2013)
 Blue Blue  With Knutsson, Spering, Schultz (2015)
 Gothenburg (Country & Eastern, 2018)

As sideman
 Lennart Aberg, Green Prints (Caprice, 1986)
 Don Cherry, Organic Music Society (Carpice, 1973)
 Don Cherry, Eternal Now (Sonet, 1974)
 Dag Vag, Almanacka (Silence, 1983)
 Zia Mohiuddin Dagar & Pandit Taranath, Live In Stockholm 1969 (Country & Eastern, 2015)
 Eagle-Eye Cherry, Desireless (Polydor, 1998)
 Mecki Mark Men, Mecki Mark Men (Universal, 2008)
 Mynta, Short Conversation (Fat & Tapes, 1985)
 Rena Rama, Jazz I Sverige 73 (Caprice, 1973)
 Bernt Rosengren, Notes from Underground (Harvest, 1974)

References

External links
 http://www.beche.se/ Bengt Berger's site
 http://www.countryandeastern.se/ Country & Eastern site
 http://www.myspace.com/bengtberger Bengt Berger's MySpace
 https://www.youtube.com/bengtberger Bengt Bergers YouTube

1942 births
Living people
Swedish male musicians
Musicians from Stockholm
ECM Records artists
Swedish jazz drummers
Rena Rama members